George Attla (August 8, 1933 – February 15, 2015) was a champion sprint dog musher. Attla won ten Anchorage Fur Rendezvous Championships and eight North American Open championships with a career that spanned from 1958 to 2011. Attla was the subject of a 1993 book titled George Attla: The Legend of the Sled-dog Trail, by Lewis "Lew" Freedman.

In 1974 Attla wrote a book titled Everything I Know About Training and Racing Sled Dogs. Attla died of B-cell lymphoma in February 2015.

Major mushing victories and finishes 
 Anchorage Fur Rendezvous First place finishes: 1958, 1962, 1968, 1972, 1975, 1976, 1978, 1979, 1981, and 1982.
 Iditarod Trail Sled Dog Race In 1973 Attla placed fourth in the inaugural Iditarod.

Legacy 
 On April 25, 1998, the governor of Alaska, Steve Cowper, declared April 29 as George Attla Day.
 Attla was the focus of the movie  Spirit of the Wind.
 He inspired the 2017 single "You Got to Run (Spirit of the Wind)", a collaboration between Buffy Sainte-Marie and Tanya Tagaq.

References

1933 births
2015 deaths
Alaskan Athabaskan people
Deaths from cancer in Alaska
Deaths from lymphoma
Dog mushers from Alaska
Native American sportspeople
People from North Pole, Alaska
People from Yukon–Koyukuk Census Area, Alaska